Karlus is an unincorporated community located in Russell County, Kentucky, United States.

References

Unincorporated communities in Russell County, Kentucky
Unincorporated communities in Kentucky